Elaine Genovese (born 11 January 1991) is a Maltese tennis player.

She has a career-high singles ranking by the Women's Tennis Association (WTA) of 902, achieved on 24 December 2018.

Genovese has represented Malta in Fed Cup, where she has a win–loss record of 31–36.

ITF finals

Doubles (1–1)

External links
 
 
 

1991 births
Living people
Maltese female tennis players
Competitors at the 2022 Mediterranean Games
Mediterranean Games silver medalists for Malta
Mediterranean Games medalists in tennis
People from Pietà, Malta
People from Sliema
20th-century Maltese women
21st-century Maltese women